Heathured is an Anglo-Saxon name borne by several people:

 Egfrid of Lindisfarne (died 821), also known as Heathured, Bishop of Lindisfarne
 Heathured of Worcester (died 709 or 800), Bishop of Worcester